Mary Bassett Clarke (Bassett; pen name, Ida Fairfield; November 18, 1831 – August 2, 1908) was an American writer of the long nineteenth century. She was a contributor to The Flag of Our Union, Rural New Yorker, as well as periodicals issued by the Seventh Day Baptists. Autumn Leaves was published in 1894.

Early life and education
Mary Bassett was born in Independence, New York, November 18, 1831. She was the daughter of John Chandler Bassett, a well-to-do farmer of western New York, and Martha (St. John) Bassett. She was the seventh in a family of twelve children who lived to maturity. She was educated in Alfred University. Although ill-health limited her opportunities, she was graduated from the university in 1857.

Career
At the age of fifteen, she began writing for publication, under the pen-name "Ida Fairfield," in The Flag of Our Union. With some interruption by ill-health, she continued many years to be a contributor to that paper, to the Rural New Yorker, as well as local papers and periodicals. For several years her writings, both prose and verse, were principally given to periodicals issued by the Seventh Day Baptists, of which religion she was a member. A collection of her poems, Autumn Leaves, was published in 1894 (Buffalo).

Personal life
She married William Lewis Clarke (1835–1920) on September 8, 1859, and removed to Ashaway, Rhode Island. He served as president of the Missionary Board, and as a Massachusetts State Senator. The Clarke's had three children: Ada Augusta (b. 1861), John Thomas (b. 1863), and Charles Welling (b. 1865). She died August 2, 1908.

Selected works
 1894, Autumn Leaves

References

Attribution

External links
 
 

1831 births
1908 deaths
19th-century American writers
19th-century American women writers
19th-century pseudonymous writers
Alfred University alumni
People from Allegany County, New York
Writers from New York (state)
Seventh Day Baptists
Pseudonymous women writers
Wikipedia articles incorporating text from A Woman of the Century